Bernd Poindl (born 30 August 1941) is a German ice hockey player, who competed for SG Dynamo Weißwasser. He won the bronze medal with the East Germany national ice hockey team at the 1966 European Championships. Poindl also competed for East Germany at the 1968 Winter Olympics in Grenoble.

References 

1941 births
German ice hockey players
Living people
Ice hockey players at the 1968 Winter Olympics
Olympic ice hockey players of East Germany
SC Dynamo Berlin (ice hockey) players
People from Görlitz (district)
Sportspeople from Saxony